Lift are a German rock band formed in Dresden in 1973 and remains active at the present day.

History
The group was founded in 1973 following the dissolution of the group Dresden Sextett. Their first concert was given on January 28, 1973. The group underwent a series of lineup changes in its early years; of the group's early members, only Werther Lohse, who joined the group in 1974, is still a member. Their first album was released in 1977; shortly after this, members Henry Pacholski and Gerhard Zachar were killed in a traffic accident while touring in Poland. Two further LPs were issued in 1979 and 1981, after which time the group fell from fame. Their 1987 album is now something of a rarity.

After the fall of the Berlin Wall they toured the newly reunited Germany, playing often with the groups Electra and Stern-Combo Meißen. They continued to tour and record into the 2000s.

Members
Founding members
Gerhard Zachar - bass (died 1978)
Konrad Burkert - drums
Jürgen Heinrich - guitar
Till Patzer - alto saxophone, transverse flute
Manfred Nytsch - trombone
Wolfgang Scheffler - keyboards
Karl-Matthias Pflugbeil - trumpet
Bernd Schlund - vocals
Christiane Ufholz - vocals

Current members
Werther Lohse - vocals, percussion (since 1974)
Bodo Kommnick - guitar, vocals
Yvonne Fechner - violin, vocals
Peter Michailow - drums
Jens Brüssow - bass

Former members
Stephan Trepte - vocals (1973–75)
Franz Bartzsch - keyboards, vocals (1973–74)
Michael Heubach - keyboards (1974–1985)
Henry Pacholski - vocals (1975–78; died 1978)
Hans Wintoch - violin, keyboards, vocals (1984)

Discography

LPs 
 1976: Lift (Amiga)
 1979: Meeresfahrt (Amiga)
 1981: Spiegelbild (Amiga)
 1987: Nach Hause (Amiga)

CDs 
 1992: Rock aus Deutschland Ost 6 - Wasser und Wein
 1994: Spiegelbild / Nach Hause
 1995: Best of Lift
 1995: Meine Schulden
 1996: Die schönsten Balladen
 1998/2003: LIFT classics
 1999: Nach Süden
 1999: Sachsendreier live (with electra and Stern-Combo Meißen)
 2000: Lift
 2000: Meeresfahrt
 2000: Lift Unplugged
 2003: Classics & unplugged
 2005: Tagesreise – Best (1976–2003)
 2007: Sachsendreier live – die Zweite (with electra and Stern-Combo Meißen)
 2008: Hits & Raritäten (Buschfunk)

DVD 
 2005: Sachsendreier Live (with electra and Stern-Combo Meißen)

References

Further reading

External links 

  
 

German musical groups